Ollie Betteridge (born 16 January 1996) is a British ice hockey player for Hungarian Erste Liga side Ferencvárosi TC and the British national team.

He represented Great Britain at the 2019 IIHF World Championship and 2021 IIHF World Championship.

References

External links

1996 births
Living people
English ice hockey forwards
Ferencvárosi TC (ice hockey) players
Nottingham Lions players
Nottingham Panthers players
Sportspeople from Nottingham
Swindon Wildcats players